James Hadden Neilson (7 November 1887 – 28 October 1917) was a Scottish professional football forward who played in the Scottish League for Aberdeen.

Personal life 
Neilson served in the Lovat Scouts and the Queen's Own Cameron Highlanders during the First World War and was holding the rank of sergeant when he was killed in Greece during the Salonika Campaign on 28 October 1917. He was buried in Kirechkoi-Hortakoi Military Cemetery, near Exochi. His brothers Rolland and Charles (the latter also a footballer) were also killed during the war.

Honours 
Aberdeen
 Fleming Charity Shield: 1911–12

Career statistics

References 

Scottish footballers
1917 deaths
British Army personnel of World War I
British military personnel killed in World War I
Lovat Scouts soldiers
Scottish Football League players
Aberdeen F.C. players
Queen's Own Cameron Highlanders soldiers
Association football forwards
People from Ellon, Aberdeenshire
Ellon United F.C. players
Huntly F.C. players
1887 births
Footballers from Aberdeenshire